Kanho Banyo Common Man (કાન્હો બન્યો કૉમન મેન) is a Gujarati sitcom which airs on Colors Gujarati. The first episode of the serial was aired on 3 November 2014. The serial is produced by 'Entity Production' and was awarded as Best Serial in Transmedia Awards - 2014.

Plot summary
The story revolves around the daily happenings of the Mehta family, settled in Jamnagar. The main lead, Gopal, dies due to an accident and Yamraj takes him to heaven. Gopal does not want to stay there as he has responsibilities to fulfill the dreams of each of his family members. But, lord Krishna refuses to give him his life back. Gopal challenges Lord Krishna to live on the Earth as a common man, without any divine powers. Lord Krishna accepts his challenge, and comes to Earth as a common man: Gopal.

Cast
 Ashish Bhatt - As Rasiklal Mehta
 Sanchi Peswani - As Hasumatiben Mehta
 Sagar Panchal - As Gopal Mehta
 Harikrishna Dave - As Bhupesh Mehta
 Bhakti Rathod
 Deepmala Parmar - As Avantika Bhupesh Mehta
 Pari Gala - As Kokila Mehta
 Suhaan Khan - As Dhiren Vasavda
 Pooja Damania - As Geetika
 Hitesh Rawal - As Durjansinh Bapu
 Abhijeet Chitre - As Hawaldar Naresh
 Mayur Bhavsar - As Inspector Kanodia

Guest Appearance
 Mukesh Rawal
 Meghana Solanki - As Sweety (Lawyer) & Kanku
 Aniket Tank - As Kamlesh (Friend of Mrs. Avantika Mehta)
 Sanjivani Sathe - Kusum (Friend of Mrs. Hasumatiben/ Mirande's Mother)

References

Satirical television shows
Indian comedy television series
Colors Gujarati original programming
Gujarati-language television shows